Nemo Rossi is the pen name of two Finnish authors, Mika Rissanen and Juha Tahvanainen.

Rossi is known for his young adult thrillers, Arkeomysteeri (Archeomystery) series. In the books, taking place either in contemporary Italy or Greece,  three teenagers solve crime mysteries linked with ancient mythology and history.  Rossi's novels discuss e.g. the legend of the Roman birth myth and the legacy of Alexander the Great.

Bibliography

References

External links
 Arkeomysteeri

Finnish crime writers
Finnish children's writers
Finnish male novelists
Thriller writers
21st-century Finnish novelists
21st-century male writers